Chrysojasminum is a genus of flowering plants belonging to the family Oleaceae.

Its native range is Macaronesia, Mediterranean to Central China and Sri Lanka, Ethiopia to Zambia.

Species:

Chrysojasminum bignoniaceum 
Chrysojasminum floridum 
Chrysojasminum fruticans 
Chrysojasminum goetzeanum 
Chrysojasminum humile 
Chrysojasminum leptophyllum 
Chrysojasminum odoratissimum 
Chrysojasminum parkeri 
Chrysojasminum stans 
Chrysojasminum subhumile

References

Oleaceae
Oleaceae genera